Claudio Roca (born 26 April 1989 in Mexico City, Mexico) is a Mexican actor, best known in his native country for telenovelas as Cachito de cielo (2012), the second season Señora Acero (2015), La Doña (2016–2017), and Muy padres (2017). He studied acting and dramaturgy at the Televisa Centro de Educación Artística, and Stella Adler Studio of Acting in New York, United States.

Filmography

Film roles

Television roles

References

External links 
 

People educated at Centro de Estudios y Formación Actoral
Living people
1989 births
People from Mexico City
21st-century Mexican male actors
Mexican male telenovela actors
Mexican male television actors